The 2005 FIBA Europe Under-18 Championship was an international basketball competition held in Serbia and Montenegro in 2005.

Final ranking
1. 

2.  Turkey

3.  Italy

4.  Spain

5.  Russia

6.  France

7.  Israel

8.  Latvia

9.  Lithuania

10.  Slovenia

11.  Croatia

12.  Bulgaria

13.  Greece

14.  Germany

15.  Poland

16.  Belgium

Awards

External links
FIBA Archive

FIBA U18 European Championship
2005–06 in European basketball
2005–06 in Serbian basketball
International youth basketball competitions hosted by Serbia